The following table lists the regions of the Earth at various latitudes:
{| class="wikitable sortable"

! Latitude
! Locations
|-
|90° N
|North Pole
|-
|75° N
|Arctic Ocean; Russia; northern Canada; Greenland
|-
|60° N
|Oslo, Norway; Helsinki, Finland; Stockholm, Sweden; major parts of Nordic countries in EU; St. Petersburg, Russia; southern Alaska United States; southern border of the Yukon and the Northwest territories in Canada; Shetland, UK
|-
| 45° N
| Spain; France; northern Italy; Croatia; Bosnia and Herzegovina; Belgrade, Serbia; Romania; the Black Sea; Ukraine; Russia; the Caspian Sea; Kazakhstan; Uzbekistan; China; Mongolia; Hokkaidō, Japan;  United States; Ontario, Canada
|-
| 30° N
|Palestine; Morocco; Algeria; Israel; Libya; Giza, Egypt; Jordan; Saudi Arabia; Iraq; Kuwait; the Persian Gulf; Iran; Afghanistan; Pakistan; India; Nepal; southern China; southern Japan; northern Mexico; United States
|-
| 15° N
| Senegal; Mauritania; Mali; Burkina Faso; Niger; Chad; Sudan; Eritrea; Yemen; southern India; Myanmar (Burma); Thailand; Laos; Vietnam; Philippines; Northern Mariana Islands; southern Mexico; Guatemala; Honduras; Nicaragua; Cape Verde
|-
| 0°
| São Tomé and Príncipe; Gabon; Republic of the Congo; Democratic Republic of the Congo; Uganda; Lake Victoria; Kenya; Somalia; Malaysia; Singapore; Indonesia; Galápagos Islands and Quito, Ecuador; Colombia; Brazil
|-
| 15° S
| Angola; Zambia; Mozambique; Malawi; Madagascar; northern Australia; Vanuatu; French Polynesia; Peru; Bolivia; Brazil
|-
| 30° S
| South Africa; Lesotho; southern Australia; Chile; Argentina; Southern Brazil
|-
| 45° S
| New Zealand; Chile; Argentina
|-
| 60° S
| entirely ocean (slightly north of the South Orkney Islands); sometimes considered the northern boundary of the Southern Ocean
|-
| 75° S
| Dome C, Antarctica
|-
| 90° S
| South Pole
|}

See also
List of national capitals by latitude
List of northernmost items
List of southernmost items
Northernmost settlements
Southernmost settlements

Lists of countries by geography